Franz Ignatz Cassian Hallaschka; Czech: František Ignác Kassián Halaška (10 July 1780, Bautsch – 12 July 1847, Prague) was a Moravian physicist.

In 1799 he became a member of the Piarists. He studied mathematics, physics, philosophy and theology at schools in Strassnitz, Nikolsburg and Kremsier, receiving his ordination in April 1804. In 1806 he taught classes in mathematics and physics at the Ordenscollegium in Nikolsburg, and during the following year, obtained his PhD at the University of Vienna. In 1808 he became a professor of physics in Brünn, where he established an observatory. From 1814 to 1833 he was a professor of physics at the University of Prague. In 1816 he published "", a work in which he calculated all solar eclipses observable from the Earth for the years 1816 up until 1860. In 1823 he became a member of the Royal Bohemian Society of Sciences, and in 1831 was appointed university rector.

From 1838 until his death he served as a provost to Alt-Bunzlau and as a country prelate of Bohemia.

Selected works 
 , (The elements of eclipses), 1816.
 , 1822 – The Moravian city of Bautsch in geographic-topographical and historical relationships.
 , 1822 – Geographical localization of Alt-Bunzlau.
 , 1824 – Manual of nature philosophy. 
  (with Franz Xaver Heinrich Kreylich) 1826 – Geographical localization of Steinschönau.

References 

1780 births
1847 deaths
Academic staff of the University of Vienna
19th-century Austrian physicists
Czech physicists
People from Budišov nad Budišovkou
Rectors of Charles University
Czech Roman Catholic clergy
19th-century Austrian Roman Catholic priests
Moravian-German people
Piarists